Julia Ford (born March 30, 1990) is an American alpine skier and a member of the United States Ski Team's alpine skiing program. Ford competed in the 2014 Winter Olympics in Sochi, Russia.

References

External links 
United States Ski Team Profile for Julie Ford

1990 births
Living people
Alpine skiers at the 2014 Winter Olympics
American female alpine skiers
Olympic alpine skiers of the United States
21st-century American women
Holderness School alumni